Safaa El Agib Adam (born 1960, El-Geneina, West Darfur, Sudan) is a social activist.

After graduating from the University of Khartoum, Elagib joined the Save the Children Fund (SCF) UK for a year, working on relief operations in Darfur and relief coordination in Port Sudan. She is currently affiliated with many organizations as a volunteer and private consultant. Elagib's current focuses are supporting underprivileged women and as a peace activist.

Elagib was awarded a human rights prize by the Swiss Freedom and Human Rights Foundation.

References 

Living people
1960 births
Date of birth missing (living people)
People from White Nile (state)
University of Khartoum alumni
Sudanese women's rights activists